Kashmiri Hindus are ethnic Kashmiris who practice Hinduism and are native to the Kashmir Valley of India. With respect to their contributions to Indian philosophy, Kashmiri Hindus developed the tradition of Kashmiri Shaivism. After their exodus from the Kashmir Valley in the wake of the Kashmir insurgency in the 1990s, most Kashmiri Hindus are now settled in the Jammu division of Jammu and Kashmir and other parts of the country. The largest group of Kashmiri Hindus are the Kashmiri Pandits.

History

Ancient 
During the reign of Ashoka (304–232 BCE), Kashmir became a part of the Maurya Empire and Buddhism was introduced in Kashmir. During this period, many stupas, some shrines dedicated to Shiva, and the city of Srinagari (Srinagar) were built. Kanishka (127–151 CE), an emperor of the Kushan Empire, conquered Kashmir and established the new city of Kanishkapur.

Medieval  
The Karkota dynasty (625–855 CE) ruled over the Kashmir and parts of northern Indian subcontinent  and their rule saw political expansion, economic prosperity and emergence of Kashmir as a centre of culture and scholarship. Lalitaditya Muktapida (724–760 CE) was a powerful ruler of the Karkota dynasty of Kashmir region in the Indian subcontinent. After the seventh century, significant developments took place in Kashmiri Hinduism. In the centuries that followed, Kashmir produced many poets, philosophers, and artists who contributed to Sanskrit literature and Hindu religion. Among notable scholars of this period was Vasugupta who wrote the Shiva Sutras which laid the foundation for a monistic Shaiva system called Kashmir Shaivism.

After the dawn of the Lohara dynasty, Islam had penetrated into countries outside Kashmir and in the absence of support from Hindus, who were in the majority, Rinchana needed the support of the Kashmiri Muslims. Shah Mir's coup on Rinchana's successor secured Muslim rule and the rule of his dynasty in Kashmir.

Demography 
The largest community within the Kashmiri Hindus are the Kashmiri Pandits (Kashmiri Brahmins), who are divided into several gotras, such as the priests (gor or bhasha Bhatta), astrologers (Zutshi), and workers (Karkun).

The Wani are historically Banias, with subcastes, such as the Kesarwani. During the Mughal era, many Kesarwanis migrated to other parts of India such as Madhya Pradesh, Bihar and Uttar Pradesh.

According to officials, 98,600 Kashmiri Hindus were issued domicile certificates of Jammu and Kashmir up to the end of June 2021. They further state, "90,430 domicile certificates were issued to displaced Kashmiri Pandits, while 2,340 families of displaced Kashmiri Pandits were registered as fresh migrants. Of these, 8,170 individuals received the domicile certificate."

On 16 May 2020, Order 52 was issued by the Jammu and Kashmir Department of Disaster Management, Relief, Rehabilitation and Reconstruction (JK DMRRR) which states that: "Bonafide migrants and bonafide displaced persons who are not yet registered with the relief and rehabilitation commissioner (migrant), Jammu and Kashmir, can apply before the competent authority for registration for purpose of issuance of a domicile certificate only." This is as long as one of the necessary documents is provided. The timeframe for registration (and claiming domicile) of Kashmiri migrants and displaced persons was later extended for the final time up to 15 May 2022.

Persecution 

Under the rule of Sultan Sikander Butshikan in the 14th century CE, many Kashmiri Hindus were forcibly converted to Islam. They began to leave the valley in much greater numbers in the 1990s during the eruption of militancy following large scale militarization of Valley.

Notable people 
This is a list of notable Kashmiri Hindus.

 Anupam Kher, Indian actor
 Kunal Khemu, Indian actor
 R N Kao, one of the founders and First Secretary of RAW
 Krsna (rapper), Indian rapper
 Jawaharlal Nehru, first Prime Minister of India
 Mohit Raina, Indian actor
 Samay Raina, standup comedian and chess enthusiast
 Bhasha Sumbli, Indian actress
 Tika Lal Taploo, lawyer
 Motilal Nehru, lawyer and leader of Indian National Congress
 Indira Gandhi, former Prime Minister of India
 P. N. Haksar, bureaucrat and diplomat
 Tej Bahadur Sapru, freedom fighter, lawyer, and politician
Tapishwar Narain Raina, ninth Chief of the Army Staff of Indian Army
 Sanjiv Bhatt, Indian Police Service officer of the Gujarat-cadre
 Ram Chandra Kak, Prime Minister of Jammu and Kashmir (1945-1947)
 Mohan Lal Zutshi, traveler, diplomat, and author, and an important player in the Great Game.

See also 
Dogra Rajput
Kashmiri Muslim tribes from Hindu lineage
Kashmiri diaspora

Bibliography 
 The Hindu History of Kashmir by Horace Hayman Wilson 
 Kashmir Hindu Religious Culture By Chaman Lal Gadoo 
 Hindus of Kashmir - A Genocide Forgotten by Bansi Pandit 
 The Hindu-Buddhist Sculpture of Ancient Kashmir and Its Influences By John Siudmak 
 Kashmir: Its Aborigines and Their Exodusby Colonel Tej K Tikoo   
 Kasheer - A Diabolical Betrayal of Kashmiri Hindus By Sahana Vijayakumar 
 Genocide of Hindus in Kashmir by Suruchi Prakashan
 The Infidel Next Door By Rajat Kanti Mitra 
 The Odyssey Of Kashmiri Pandits Destination-Homeland-Panun Kashmir by Dr M. L. Bhat

References

External links 

Kashmiri people
Kashmiri Hindus
Kashmiri Pandits
Hinduism in Jammu and Kashmir
Hindu ethnic groups
Social groups of Jammu and Kashmir
Social groups of India
Kashmiri tribes
Hindu communities